Harry Delbert Thiers (January 22, 1919 in Fort McKavett, Texas – August 8, 2000 in Ohio) was an American mycologist who studied and named many fungi native to North America, particularly California. Thiers taught mycology at San Francisco State University. He comprehensively revised and expanded on the North American collection of boletes and named many new species.

Species authored include:
Suillellus amygdalinus
Boletus barrowsii
Xerocomellus dryophilus
Rubroboletus pulcherrimus
Gymnopilus luteoviridis
Leccinum manzanitae
Russula xanthoporphyrea

The fungal genera of Chaetothiersia and Harrya ,  and also the species of Cortinarius thiersii were all named in his honor.

Harry D. Thiers Herbarium
San Francisco State University (SFSU) established the herbarium in 1959 with the name the "San Francisco State University Herbarium". When Thiers retired in 1989 the herbarium was given its present name. Thiers and his students collected most of the early specimens. Later, Dennis E. Desjardin and his students made major contributions. The herbarium has taxonomic coverage of fleshy fungi, lichens, bryophytes, and vascular plants. Specimens were collected from North America (especially California), South America, the Hawaiian Islands, Indonesia, southeast Asia, Micronesia, and Madagascar.

References

External links
"MSSF mourns Harry Thiers" by Mike Boom, Mycena News 50(9):1,7, September 2000.

American mycologists
People from Menard County, Texas
1919 births
2000 deaths
20th-century American botanists
Schreiner University alumni
University of Texas at Austin alumni
University of Michigan alumni
San Francisco State University faculty